Agnes Dürer née Frey (1475–1539) was the wife of the German artist Albrecht Dürer. During their marriage, which was childless, she was portrayed several times by Dürer.

Agnes Dürer was the daughter of the coppersmith and lute maker Hans Frey and his wife Anna, a member of the patrician family Rummel.

Marriage to Albrecht Dürer
On 7 July 1494 Agnes married Albrecht Dürer, who was forced to stop his grand tour of Europe by his parents in order to marry her. According to the family chronicle she had a dowry of 200 guilders.

A first portrait drawing of Agnes from 1494 is known. Agnes Dürer was mostly responsible for the marketing of her husband's prints. They regularly visited fairs in order to sell his engravings; but usually they sold his prints at the Nuremberg weekly market. Their participation in fairs in Leipzig and Frankfurt are also documented. From September 1505 until May 1506 she did not return to her hometown from a visit to Frankfurt, probably because in Nuremberg the plague had broken out.

During the second trip by Albrecht Dürer to Italy she ran the workshop. In the years 1520 and 1521 the couple traveled together in the Netherlands. The last known portrait of her which was painted on her 27th wedding anniversary, was from this period.

Her marriage with Albrecht Dürer remained childless. With Albrecht Dürer the family name died out. The marriage was not a generally happy one, as indicated by the letters of Albrecht Dürer in which he quipped to Willibald Pirckheimer in an extremely rough tone about his wife. He called her an "old crow" and made other vulgar remarks. Pirckheimer also made no secret of his antipathy towards Agnes, describing her as a miserly shrew with a bitter tongue, who helped cause Dürer's death at a young age. One author believes Albrecht was bisexual, if not homosexual, due to several of his works containing themes of homosexual desire, as well as the intimate nature of his correspondence with certain very close male friends.

After the death of her husband (she was the sole heir), Agnes Dürer continued to sell his works. This was confirmed by Charles V, Holy Roman Emperor in 1528 with his purchase of Dürer's book Of human proportions. She died in 1539 in Nuremberg.

Literature 
 Hans Rupprich (ed. ): Dürer Written papers. Volume 1, autobiographical writings, correspondence, seals, inscriptions, notes and reports, certificates for personal life, German Association for the Arts, Berlin 1956
 Albrecht Durer: The Complete Works The Complete Paintings, drawings, engravings and woodcuts. The monograph "Albrecht Dürer, work and impact" by Fyodor Anzelewsky. Changed edition, Direct Media Publ, Berlin 2000, 1 CD-ROM (Digital Library; 28th) 
 Corine Schleif: "Das pos weyb Agnes Frey Dürer: Geschichte ihrer Verleumdung und Versuche der Ehrenrettung," ("The Bad Wife Agnes Frey Dürer: History of her Defamation and Attempts at her Rehabilitation"), in: Mitteilungen des Vereins für Geschichte der Stadt Nürnberg 86 (1999), 47-79
 Corine Schleif: "Agnes Frey Dürer, verpackt in Bildern und vereinnahmt in Geschichten," ("Agnes Frey Dürer, Packaged in Pictures and Appropriated in Stories"), in: Am Anfang war Sigena. Ein Nürnberger Frauengeschichtsbuch, edited by Gaby Franger and Nadja Bennewitz, Cadolzburg 1999, 2000, 67-77
 Corine Schleif: "Albrecht Dürer between Agnes Frey and Willibald Pirckheimer," in: The Essential Dürer, ed. Larry Silver and Jeffrey Chipps Smith, Philadelphia 2010, 85–205

References

External links 
 German National Library

1475 births
1539 deaths
Businesspeople from Nuremberg
Albrecht Dürer
16th-century German businesspeople